Oliver Byrne (31 July 1810 – 9 December 1880) was a civil engineer and prolific author of works on subjects including mathematics, geometry, and engineering. He is best known for his 'coloured' book of Euclid's Elements. He was also a large contributor to Spon's Dictionary of Engineering.

Family and early life
Byrne reports the Vale of Avoca, County Wicklow, Ireland as his birthplace. The son of Lawrence Oliver Byrne and Mary Byrne, he had a younger brother John who co-authored a book with him. Little is known about his childhood.  He emerges in Dublin at age 20 with his first publication. By the age of 29, Byrne was noted as the "principal support of an aged mother and sisters in Ireland." Later in England, he was appointed Professor of Mathematics in the College for Civil Engineers at Putney.

Marriage
His wife Eleanor (née Rugg), was 12 years younger than Oliver and published meteorological articles and books.  She is featured on a token struck to commemorate Oliver Byrne's invention of Byneore.

Byrne's Euclid

His most innovative educational work was a version of the first six books of Euclid's Elements that used coloured graphic explanations of each geometric principle. It was published by William Pickering in 1847.

The book has become the subject of renewed interest in recent years for its innovative graphic conception and its style which prefigures the modernist experiments of the Bauhaus and De Stijl movements. Information design writer Edward Tufte refers to the book in his work on graphic design and McLean in his Victorian book design of 1963. In 2010 Taschen republished the work in a facsimile edition and in 2017 a project was launched to extend the work to the remaining works of Euclid.

Byrne described himself as a mathematician, civil engineer, military engineer, and mechanical engineer and indicates on the title pages of one of his books that he was surveyor of Queen Victoria's settlement in the Falkland Islands.  Evidence shows Byrne never traveled to the Falkland Islands.

The U.S. Library of Congress has a steel-engraved portrait of Oliver Byrne.

Engineering and inventions
Byrne engaged in numerous railroad projects and invented mechanical devices including the following:
 The Byrnegraph
 The Gauger's Patent Calculating Instruments.

In 1842, Oliver Byrne and Henry William Hull (BA, CE) made a proposal for a School of Mathematics, Engineering, Classics, and General Literature at Surrey Villa, near Lambeth Palace.

Byrne was an anti-phrenologist, and wrote a book on the fallacy of phrenology.

Irish independence
In 1853 while residing in the US, Oliver Byrne wrote a book titled Freedom to Ireland, published in Boston.  The book advocates Irish revolt against British rule and outlining house and street fighting, handling of small arms, etc. Oliver toured the United States providing lessons in the use of small arms, field fortifications, pike exercises and street fighting. Freedom to Ireland was dedicated 'To the memory of William Byrne, Esq., of Ballymanus, County Wicklow, Ireland,' and to the fulsome list of qualities attributed to the dedicatee was the rather dubious claim that Billy 'by the dextrous use of the Pike destroyed two thousand of his country's enemy; and out of twenty-seven engagements in the open field, won twenty-one. In the preface to one of his books, Oliver Byrne has the following dedication:

TO THE MEMORY OF WILLIAM BYRNE, ESQ;,  OF BALLYMANUS, COUNTY WICKLOW, IRELAND, WHO WAS EXECUTED FOR FIDELITY AND LOYALTY TO HIS COUNTRY IN 1798 THIS WORK IS DEDICATED.  BYRNE WAS A MAN OF LARGE FORTUNE AND ESTATES, OF RARE COURAGE, AND GREAT MILITARY SKILL, AND OF MUCH PERSONAL STRENGTH AND BEAUTY; HE DID NOT LOSE HIS LIFE AND ESTATES, OR BETRAY HIS COUNTRY, BY MAKING LONG SPEECHES TO TEACH THE ENEMY. HE WAS NOT ONE OF THE BEGARRLY BRIEFLASS SPOUTING POLITICAL TRICKSTER HUMBUGS;  NO, BUT ONE WHO IN CONJUNCTION WITH HIS BROTHER GARRET BYRNE AND COUSIN MICHAEL DWYER, LED ON HIS COUNTRYMEN, AND BY THE DEXTERIOUS USE OF THE PIKE, DESTROYED 2000 OF HIS COUNTRY'S ENEMY; AND OUT OF 27 ENGAGEMENTS IN THE OPEN FIELD, WON TWENTY ONE....etc.

The United Irishmen (who consisted of Protestants and Catholics alike) and the Irish Home Rule Association, both supported by Byrne, declared their belief in a peaceful future for Ireland in which Protestants and Catholics could live together in peace and with equality.

Death
Byrne died aged 70, on 9 December 1880 of bronchial pneumonia, in Maidstone, Kent, and is buried in Maidstone (Sutton Road) Cemetery, Kent, England.

Works
A list of his works includes:
 A Treatise on Diophantine Algebra. Dublin: Allen and Co., 1830.
A Pamphlet on the Teaching of Geometry by Coloured Diagrams, etc. Applied to the First Book of Euclid.London: Printed for the Author. 1831.
A Short Practical Treatise on Spherical Trigonometry, etc. London: A. J. Valpy, 1835.
How to Measure the Earth with the Assistance of Railroads. Newcastle-upon-Tyne: Currie and Bowman, 1838.
New and Improved System of Logarithms … Also, an appendix, containing tables of trigonometric formulae, etc. William Day: London, 1838.
The Navigator's Ready Calculator; designed for the practical Sailor, being a complete and easy introduction to navigation, and containing a newly-invented instrument, by means of which all of the cases in the different sailings are solved. William Day: London, 1838 or 1839.
The Creed of Saint Athanasius proved by a Mathematical Parallel. London: William Day, 1839.
The Practical, Complete and Correct Gager, containing a description of Parker and Byrne’s patent calculating instruments; with their use and applications. London: A.H. Bailey & Co., 1840.
The Doctrine of Proportion clearly developed … or, the Fifth book of Euclid simplified. London: J. Williams, 1841.
"Exemplary Institute for Mathematics, Engineering, Classics and General Literature, Surrey Villa, near Lambeth Palace." Prospectus written with Henry William Hull. London: W. Barnes, c. 1842.
"Unwillingness of Man to Investigate," American Railroad Journal and Mechanics Magazine, Vol VIII—New Series or Vol. XIV, 91-93. New York: George C. Schaeffer, 1842.
"Description and use of an instrument to find the time by the sun, moon, or any of the visible fixed stars:as well as the names of those stars / invented and constructed for the Right Hon. Earl Fitzwilliam." Oliver Byrne. Manuscript. Houghton Library, Harvard University. Boston. 1843.
The Fallacies of Our Own Time “Anti-Phrenology” (with John Byrne). London: Sherwood, Gilbert & Piper, 1844.
Description and Use of the Byrnegraph: an instrument for multiplying, dividing, and comparing lines, angles, surfaces, and solids. London: C. & J. Adlard, 1846.
"A New Theory of the Earth, that Fully Accounts for Many Astronomical, Geographical, and Geological Phenomena, Hitherto Unaccounted For," Civil Engineer and Architect's Journal, 10:99-101 (April 1847) and 10:133-134 (May 1847).
The First Six Books of the Elements of Euclid in Which Coloured Diagrams and Symbols Are Used Instead of Letters for the Greater Ease of Learners. London: William Pickering, 1847.
The Calculus of Form. Never published, 1848.
The Miscellaneous Mathematical Papers of Oliver Byrne, Collected and edited by John Byrne. London: Maynard, 1848.
Practical, Short, and Direct Method of Calculating the Logarithm of any given number corresponding to any given Logarithm. New York: D. Appleton & Co., 1849.
A Dictionary of Machines, Mechanics, Engine Work, and Engineering. New York: D. Appleton & Co., 1851.
Pocketbook for Railroad and Civil Engineers. New York: Shepherd, 1851.
The Practical Metal-Worker’s Assistant: containing the arts of working all metals and alloys with the application of electro-metallurgy to manufacturing processes, etc. A new, revised, and improved edition, with additions by John Scoffern…William Clay, William Fairbairn… and James Napier, etc. Philadelphia: H.C. Baird, 1851 and 1864.
The Pocket Companion for Machinists, Mechanics and Engineers, etc. New York: Dewitt & Davenport, 1851.
The Practical Cotton Spinner, and Manufacturer. Philadelphia: Henry Carey Baird, 1851.
The practical spinner, and manufacturer: the managers’, overlookers’, and mechanics’ companion. A comprehensive system of calculations of mill gearing and machinery … To which are added, compendious tables of yarns. New York: R. Scott, 1851.
Practical Model Calculator, for the engineer, mechanic, machinist, manufacturer of engine-work, naval architect, miner, and millwright. Philadelphia: H.C. Baird & Co, 1852, 1862, 1872.
Freedom to Ireland: The Art and Science of War for the People. The Pike Exercise, Foot Lancers, Light Infantry, and Rifle Drill. To which is Added a Short Practical Treatise on Small Arms, and Ammunition, Street and House Fighting, and Field Fortification. Boston: Patrick Donahoe, 1853.
Lectures on the Art and Science of War: addressed to Irish American citizen soldiers. Boston: Patrick Donahoe, 1853.
Mechanics: their principles and practical applications. New York: De Witt & Davenport, 1853.
The American Engineer, Draftsman, and Machinist’s Assistant. Philadelphia: C.A. Brown & Co., 1853.
The Handbook for the Artisan, Mechanic, and Engineer. Philadelphia: T. K. Collins, Jr., 1853.
The Calculator’s Constant Companion, for practical men, machinists, mechanics and engineers.Philadelphia: J.W. Moore, 1854.
The Evidence of Oliver Byrne in the Patent Case of Ross Winans' Eight-wheeled Car. London: Murphy, 1855.
Pocket-Book for Railroad and Civil Engineers. Containing new, exact, and concise methods for laying out railroad curves, switches, etc. New York: C. Shepard & Co., 1856.
The Mechanics’ Manual: a pocket companion for working carpenters, joiners, etc. New York : J.M. Fairchild & Co., 1856.
Vade Mecum. De L’Ingénieur, de Chemins de Fer Donnant. Paris: Imprimerie et Libraire Centrales des Chemins de Fer. De Napoléon Chaix et Ce, Rue Bergère, 1856.
Byrne's price book, ready reckoner and measurer: for merchants and traders; ship builders and lumber dealers; farmers and drovers; banks and stock companies. New York: Philip J. Cozans, 1857.
The apprentice, or First book for mechanics, machinists, and engineers. New York: Philip J. Cozans, 1860. (Reprinted New York: Philip J. Cozans, 1863, 1864; New York: A. J. Fisher 1874.)
"Calculations Respecting the Pressure of Steam on Cylinder covers and Other Disks," Civil Engineer and Architect's Journal (December 1860), 24:353-354.
Dual Arithmetic: A New Art. London: Bell & Daldy, 1863.
The Young Geometrician; or, Practical geometry without compasses. London: Chapman & Hall, 1865.
The Young Dual Arithmetician; or, Dual arithmetic . . . Designed for elementary instruction, etc. London: Bell & Daldy, 1866.
Dual Arithmetic A New Art. Part II. The Descending Branch of the Art, and the Science of Dual Arithmetic.London: Bell & Daldy, 1867.
Tables of Dual Logarithms, Dual Numbers, and corresponding Natural Numbers, etc. London: Bell & Daldy, 1867.
The Essential Elements of Practical Mechanics, based on the principle of work; designed for engineering students. London: E. & F. N. Spon, 1867.
General Method of Solving Equations of all degrees; applied particularly to equations of the second, third, fourth, and fifth degrees. London: E. & F. N. Spon, 1868.
Spons’ Dictionary of Engineering, Civil, Mechanical, Military and Naval, with technical terms in French, German, Italian, and Spanish. London: F. N. Spon, London and New York: 1869-74. (Note: Oliver Byrne contributed from 1869 to 1872.)sponsdictionary00spongoog
Byrne’s Treatise on Navigation and Nautical Astronomy. London: Richard Bentley and Son, 1877.
The Geometry of Compasses; or, Problems resolved by the mere description of circles, and the use of coloured diagrams and symbols. London: C. Lockwood & Co., 1877.
Byrne’s Timber and Log Book: Ready Reckoner and Price Book …. New York: The American News Company, 1878
Spon, Edward. Oliver Byrne; Ernest Spon; Francis N. Spon. Supplement to Spons’ dictionary of engineering, civil, mechanical, military, and naval. London and New York: E. & F. N. Spon, 1879-81.

References

External links

 Susan M. Hawes (Genealogist) and Sid Kolpas (Delaware County Community College), "Oliver Byrne: The Matisse of Mathematics," Convergence 12 (August 2015), accessed 8 September 2015.
 Byrne's edition of Euclid at University of British Columbia Mathematics Department and at archive.org
 Review of Taschen's edition of Byrn's Euclid from the Mathematical Association of America
 Euclid’s Elements by Oliver Byrne’s as interactive website.
 Examples of pages from Byrne's Euclid
 MetaPost + ConTeXt rendition of Oliver Byrne's "The first six books of the Elements of Euclid"
 

19th-century British writers
Irish writers
Irish mathematicians
1810 births
1890 deaths
19th-century British mathematicians